The Cut is a 1998 MTV talent series, hosted by TLC member Lisa "Left Eye" Lopes. It was the first in a line of televised song contests that later included American Idol. A handful of would-be pop stars, rappers, and rock bands competed against each other and were judged. The prizes were a record deal and MTV's funding to produce a music video, which would enter MTV's heavy rotation.

The season was won by a male-female rap duo named Silk-E, with rapper Lil' Noah taking second place. Anastacia, a then unknown singer-dancer, also made the finale, but did not win.
Other notable contestants include R&B singer and songwriter Ne-Yo (then a member of R&B group Envy) and hip-hop duo Emanon, which featured a little-known Aloe Blacc.

Premise 
Episodes were around 30 minutes long (commercials included). There were four separate acts per episode, and vary from individual singers to groups. Artists performed in no particular order, and after the performances, a panel of alternating judges rated the performance from a scale of one to ten. Half-points, such as 7.5, were allowed. Whoever had the highest score at the end of the episode advanced to the finals.

Judges

Episodes 
(Names in bold indicate the winner of the episode)

Episode 1
Original airdate: September 28, 1998

Episode 2
Original airdate: September 29, 1998

References

External links 
 

Cut, The
MTV weekday shows
1998 American television series debuts
1998 American television series endings
1990s American reality television series
English-language television shows